Tsentrolit is one of the largest foundries in the Republic of Belarus.

It was decided by the Order of the Central Committee of the Communist Party of Belarus and the Council of Ministers of BSSR to build a specialized plant under the project, developed by the Kiev institute "Hyprokhimmash", for production of iron casting for machine tools and mechanical engineering. The construction started in 1963, and in 1965 the first products were manufactured in the premises of the commissioned mechanical repair shop – non-standard equipment for the further development of the own production. The first melting was carried out on 24 October 1968. At that time, Tsentrolit belonged to the system of Minstankoprom (Ministry of machine tools industry) of the USSR, which included nine more Tsentrolit plants in various corners of the Soviet Union.

At present, many of the Tsentrolit plants either have ceased to exist or have been operating as foundry shops or small works due to difficult financial situation. Gomel Tsentrolit has managed to save its production infrastructure.

Current situation 

Since December 23 2010, Gomel Tsentrolit is officially registered as the Public joint stock company "Gomel Foundry Plant Tsentrolit (OAO GLZ Tsentrolit). In 2012, OAO GLZ Tsentrolit joined Belstankoinstrumentholding together with 15 other large Belarusian industrial enterprises.

References 
 ОАО "MZOR" – management company of "BELSTANKOINSTRUMENT" HOLDING
 Companies and organization of Gomel
 Industrial enterprises of Sovietsky district of Gomel
 Economic news of Gomel region
 Gomel "TSENTROLIT" manufactured cast iron constructions for new stations of  Moscow metro
 Gomel "TSENTROLIT"  delivers its products to pre-Olympic Sochi
 Best business executives named

External links 
 Gomel enterprises
 of the Republic of Belarus

Foundries
Metal companies of Belarus